The Republican Liberal Party (PLR) was a political party in Panama.

History
The party was part of the United People Alliance for the 1994 general elections, in which the Alliance's presidential candidate Ernesto Pérez Balladares was elected president. The PLR also won two seats in the National Assembly.

References

Defunct political parties in Panama
Political parties with year of disestablishment missing
Political parties with year of establishment missing